Mount Shackleton is a mountain, 1,465 m, with perpendicular cliffs facing west, standing  east of Chaigneau Peak between Leay and Wiggins Glaciers on Kyiv Peninsula, the west side of Graham Land in Antarctica. It was discovered by the 1908–10 French Antarctic Expedition under Charcot and named by him for Sir Ernest Shackleton.

References
 SCAR Composite Gazetteer of Antarctica.

Mountains of Graham Land
Graham Coast